Noah Scherer (born 5 October 1992) is a Swiss pair skater. With Ioulia Chtchetinina, he won three international medals and competed at two World Championships. In mid-May 2017, the Swiss skating federation announced that they had parted ways.

Programs

With Chtchetinina

Men's singles

Competitive highlights 
CS: Challenger Series; JGP: Junior Grand Prix

Pairs with Chtchetinina

Pairs with Habechian

Men's singles

References

External links 
 

1992 births
Swiss male pair skaters
Living people
People from Entlebuch District
Sportspeople from the canton of Lucerne